Oscar Grégoire Jr. (26 March 1877 in Ivanteyevka, Moscow Oblast, Russian Empire – 28 September 1947 in Brussels) was a Belgian water polo player and backstroke swimmer who competed in the 1900 Summer Olympics, in the 1908 Summer Olympics, and in the 1912 Summer Olympics. He was part of the Belgian water polo team and was able to win two silver and one bronze medal. In 1908 and 1912 he also participated in the 100-metre backstroke events, but was eliminated in the first round in both.

See also
 Belgium men's Olympic water polo team records and statistics
 List of Olympic medalists in water polo (men)

References

External links
 

1877 births
1947 deaths
Belgian male water polo players
Belgian male backstroke swimmers
Water polo players at the 1900 Summer Olympics
Water polo players at the 1908 Summer Olympics
Water polo players at the 1912 Summer Olympics
Swimmers at the 1908 Summer Olympics
Swimmers at the 1912 Summer Olympics
Olympic water polo players of Belgium
Olympic swimmers of Belgium
Olympic silver medalists for Belgium
Olympic bronze medalists for Belgium
Olympic medalists in water polo
Medalists at the 1912 Summer Olympics
Medalists at the 1908 Summer Olympics
Medalists at the 1900 Summer Olympics
Sportspeople from Moscow Oblast
20th-century Belgian people
People from Ivanteyevka